Se-Bom Lee (born 12 June 2001) is an Australian swimmer. He competed in the 400m individual medley at the 2020 Summer Olympics.

He swam a personal best of 4:14.16 at the 2021 Australian Olympic trials to book a place in the Tokyo Olympics.

References

External links
 
 
 
 
 

2001 births
Living people
Swimmers at the 2020 Summer Olympics
Australian male medley swimmers
Olympic swimmers of Australia
Swimmers at the 2022 Commonwealth Games
Commonwealth Games competitors for Australia
Sportsmen from New South Wales
Swimmers from Sydney
21st-century Australian people